East of the Sun, West of the Moon is the fourth studio album by Norwegian new wave band A-ha, released on 27 October 1990 by Warner Bros. Records. Named after a Norwegian fairy tale, the album was something of a departure from the band's earlier radio-friendly sound to a darker, moodier tone. It peaked at number one in the band's native Norway and reached top 20 in various European countries and Japan. It was co-produced by Ian Stanley, formerly of the band Tears for Fears.

Critical reception
Entertainment Weekly wrote that "symphonic piano grandeur and alternating blues/metal/flamenco/funk additives collapse beneath the bloated synthesizer slush."

AllMusic wrote: "This is a nicely crafted collection of songs, performed and sung beautifully, with lots of echoes and suggestions tucked into the music. While not an album one can discuss at length, it's an album that's a pleasure to listen to and one that deserves a better reception than the one, unfortunately, that it seems to have gotten."

Track listing

 "The Way We Talk" features Magne Furuholmen on lead vocals.

2015 deluxe edition

Personnel 
A-ha
 Morten Harket – lead vocals, backing vocals
 Magne Furuholmen – keyboards, backing vocals, string arrangements (5), second vocals (8, 10), lead vocals (9), harmonica (10)
 Paul Waaktaar-Savoy – guitars, backing vocals, second vocals (4), bass guitar (6, 7, 8), acoustic piano (11)

Additional musicians
 Jørun Bøgeberg – bass guitar (1-5, 9, 10, 11)
 Per Hillestad – drums (1-6, 8-11)
 Chris Hughes – drums (7)
 Martin Ditcham – tambourine (3, 4), percussion (10)
 Phil Todd – saxophone (3)
 David Bedford – string arrangements (7)

Production
 Christopher Neil – producer (1, 3, 4, 6, 8, 10)
 Ian Stanley – producer (2, 5, 7, 9, 11)
 Nick Davis – recording, mixing 
 Haydn Bendall – additional engineer (5, 7)
 Steve "Barney" Chase – additional engineer (5, 7)
 Kim Champagne – art direction 
 Jeri Heiden – art direction 
 REY International – design 
 Just Loomis – cover photography 
 Lauren Savoy – inner sleeve photography

Charts

Weekly charts

Year-end charts

Certifications and sales

References

1990 albums
A-ha albums
Albums produced by Christopher Neil
Warner Records albums